Arik Niger was the Nigerian subsidiary of Arik Air based in Niamey, Niger. The airline suspended operations in February 2010.

Destinations
Arik Niger served the following destinations from Niamey before ceasing operations:

Benin
Cotonou - Cadjehoun Airport
Niger
Agadez - Mano Dayak International Airport
Maradi - Maradi Airport
Niamey - Diori Hamani International Airport Base
Tahoua - Tahoua Airport
Zinder - Zinder Airport
Nigeria
Abuja - Nnamdi Azikiwe International Airport
Kano - Mallam Aminu Kano International Airport

Fleet
Arik Niger operated the following aircraft:

2 - Fokker 50 (Leased from Denim Air)

References

External links
Arik Niger
Arik Niger Fleet

Defunct airlines of Niger
Airlines established in 2009
Airlines disestablished in 2010
Transport in Niamey
Companies based in Niamey